Konstantin Valentinovich Paramonov (born 26 November 1973) is a Russian football coach and a former player.

Playing career
He scored the most league goals in Amkar's history (171). He was the top scorer in Russian First Division in 1999 (23 goals) and the top scorer in Russian Second Division in 1996 (34 goals, Zone Center) and 1998 (30 goals, Zone Ural).

Coaching career
On 22 May 2020, Ilshat Aitkulov was appointed caretaker manager of FC Orenburg. As Aitkulov does not possess the mandatory UEFA Pro Licence, Paramonov was officially registered with the league as manager. He left Orenburg on 24 July 2020, following the club's relegation from the Russian Premier League.

Personal life
His son Yevgeni Paramonov is a professional footballer.

References

External links
 Player page on the official Amkar Perm website 
 

1973 births
Living people
Sportspeople from Perm, Russia
Soviet footballers
Association football forwards
Russian footballers
FC Amkar Perm players
Russian Premier League players
Russian football managers
Russian Premier League managers
FC Amkar Perm managers
FC Orenburg managers
FC Zvezda Perm players